Triathlon at the 2011 Pacific Games in Nouméa, New Caledonia was held on September 3, 2011.

Medal summary

Medal table

Results

See also
 Triathlon at the Pacific Games

References

Triathlon at the 2011 Pacific Games

2011 Pacific Games
Pacific Games
2011